The King Baudouin Foundation is an independent and pluralistic foundation based in Brussels whose aim is to serve society. The Foundation was created in 1976, to mark the 25th anniversary of King Baudouin's reign. Its main objective is to make a lasting contribution to justice, democracy and respect for diversity.

The Foundation is associated with the  "King Baudouin African Development Prize", worth 200,000 euros, awarded every other year by the Foundation's Board of Governors.

Past winners
2018-19 - Wecyclers - Nigeria
2016-17 - BarefootLaw - Uganda, Farmerline - Ghana, Kytabu - Kenya
2014-15 - ADISCO - Burundi
2012-13 - Bogaletch Gebre - Ethiopia
2010-11 - Dr Denis Mukwege - Democratic Republic of Congo 
2008-09 - KBR68H - Indonesia 
2006-07 - Front Line - Ireland 
2004-05 - Ousmane Sy - Mali
2002-03 - Fairtrade Labelling Organizations International (FLO, secretariat located in Bonn) - Germany 
2000-01 - Fundecor (Fundación para el Desarrollo de la Cordillera Volcanica Central) - Costa Rica 
1998-99 - The Human Rights Commission of Pakistan, Chaired by Mrs Asma Jahangir - Pakistan
1996-97 - Landless Peasants' Movement - Brazil
1992-93 - The Grameen Bank - Bangladesh 
1990-91 - The Kagiso Trust - Peace Foundation - South Africa 
1988-89 - The Indian Council of Agricultural Research - India 
1986-87 - The International Foundation for Science - Sweden 
1984-85 - Dr. Walter Plowright - UK 
1982-83 - Dr. A.T. Ariyaratne - Sri Lanka 
1980-81 - Paulo Freire - Brazil 
1980-81 - The Consultative Group on International Agricultural Research - (CGIAR)

References

External links
 King Baudouin African Development Prize website

Awards established in 1980
1980 establishments in Belgium
Humanitarian and service awards
Belgian awards
Culture in Brussels